The North East Wales League represented the North East Wales area at the fifth tier of the Welsh football league system. It began life in 2011 as the Clwyd East League, and was renamed as the North East Wales League in 2015. It folded in 2020 due a reorganisation of football in the Welsh football pyramid. It was replaced by a new league at tiers 4 and 5 called the North East Wales Football League.

History

Member clubs for final 2019–20 season

Premier Division

Acton
Bellevue
Borras Park Albion
Bradley Park (resigned from the league in January 2020)
Brymbo Victoria
Caerwys
Chirk Town
Mold Town United
Penyffordd Lions
Sychdyn

References

See also
Football in Wales
Welsh football league system

5
Wales
Sports leagues established in 2011
2011 establishments in Wales
Sports leagues disestablished in 2020
2020 disestablishments in Wales
Defunct football competitions in Wales